The Politecnica Salesiana University in Ecuador is an institution of higher education and Christian inspiration with Catholic character and a Salesian. The university is characterized by its opportunities for youth, especially from the poor sectors.

History
In 1887 the Ecuador government signed an agreement with Don Bosco for the Salesians to take under their responsibility the 'Catholic Protectorate of Arts and Trades' in Quito. Ecuador was one of the first non-European countries to receive the children of the educator saint of Turin; the first was Argentina in 1877.

Foundation of the UPS
On August 5, 1994, the National Congress of Ecuador created the 'Politecnica Salesiana University', with its counterpart in the city of Cuenca, with headquarters in the cities of Quito and Guayaquil. Academic activities began in October of the same year.

2011 Protest
In April 2011, according to Ecuador's "Hoy" news, about 150 indigenous protestors prevented people from coming and going from and to the campus for several hours. This was in protest to allegedly being scammed out of money in relation to land by the school's former rector.

Organization
The Politecnica Salesiana University has four faculties and one postgraduate unit on campuses in Cuenca (C), Guayaquil (G), and Quito (Q).

Faculties and unit
 Facultad de Ciencias Administrativas y Economicas
 Administración de Empresas C, G, Q
 Contabilidad y Auditoría C, G, Q
 Gerencia y Liderazgo Q
 Facultad de Ciencias de Agropecuarias y Ambientales
 Facultad de Ciencias de Humanas y de la Educacion
 Antropología Aplicada Q
 Comunicación Social C, Q
 Cultura Física C
 Educación Intercultural Bilingüe Q
 Filosofía y Pedagogía Q
 Gestión para el Desarrollo Local Sostenible C, Q
 Pedagogía C, Q
 Psicología C, Q
 Teología Pastoral Q
 Facultad de Ingenieras
 Unidad de Posgrados
 Maestría en Educación con Mención en Gestión Educativa
 Maestría en Administración de Empresas
 Maestría en Antropología y Cultura
 Maestría en Ciencias de la Computación
 Maestría en Desarrollo Local con mención en Movimientos Sociales
 Maestría en Diseño Curricular
 Maestría en Educación Especial con mención en Educación de las Personas con Discapacidad Visual
 Maestría en Gestión de Telecomunicaciones
 Maestría en Intervención, Asesoría y Terapia Familiar Sistémica
 Maestría en Métodos Numéricos para Diseño de Ingeniería
 Maestría en Política Social de la Infancia y Adolescencia
 Maestría en Sistemas Integrados de Gestión de la Calidad, Ambiente y Seguridad
 Especialización en Educación a Distancia
 Especialización en Gerencia de Empresas de Telecomunicaciones
 Especialización en Métodos Numéricos
 Especialista en Poder y Desarrollo Local
 Diplomado Superior en Auditoría en Instituciones de Microfinanzas
 Diplomado Superior en Docencia Universitaria
 Diplomado Superior en Evaluación de la Educación Superior
 Diplomado Superior en Gerencia de Marketing
 Diplomado Superior en Gestión de Competencias

Locations
 Rectorado: Avenida Turuhuayco 3-69 y Calle Vieja. Cuenca
 Sede Matriz Cuenca: Calle Vieja 12-30 y Elia Liut. Cuenca
 Sede Quito: Avenida 12 de Octubre N24-22 y Wilson. Quito
 Sede Guayaquil: Chambers 227 entre Robles y Laura Vicuña, Guayaquil

External links
 Politécnica Salesiana University website
 Universidad Politécnica Salesiana, Spanish
 http://www.hoy.com.ec/noticias-ecuador/grupo-de-indigenas-se-toma-la-universidad-salesiana-471852.html

Education in Ecuador
Universities in Ecuador
Educational institutions established in 1994
1994 establishments in Ecuador